The Central Insurance of Iran is the agency in charge of regulating the Iranian insurance industry. Five insurance firms dominate the sector, four of which are active in commercial insurance. The leading player is the Iran Insurance Company, followed by the Asia Insurance Company, the Alborz Insurance Company and the Dana Insurance Company. Export and Investment Insurance deals with foreign trade.

History

2006
In 2006 the market share for private insurance companies stood at 54% and 46% for governmental insurance companies. At the end of 2008, there were 20 insurance firms active in the market, only 4 of which were state-owned (with a 75% market share). As of 2014, twenty-five insurance companies are active in Iran and all, except one, are privately owned. Parsian Insurance became the largest privately owned company to be listed on the Tehran Stock Exchange in 2010. Parisan is the third largest insurance provider in Iran.

2008
In 2008, the total insurance premiums generated in Iran were $4.3 billion. This is less than 0.1% of the world's total, while Iran has approximately 1% of the world's population. The insurance penetration rate is approximately 1.4%, significantly below the global average of 7.5%. This underdevelopment is also evident in product diversity.

2012
Approximately 60% of all insurance premiums are generated from car insurance. There are about 14 million vehicles in Iran and 90 percent of them are insured (2012).<ref name=menafn>{{cite web |url=http://www.menafn.com/menafn/1ec8e7dd-3f3b-4244-b315-17c982b00e12/Irans-insurance-industry-ready-to-cover-foreign-oil-tankers?src=main |title="/>  Of the 10 million motorcycles that operate on Iran's roads only 2 million are insured. Also, 95% of all premiums come from general insurance contracts and only 5% relate to life products (against world average of 58% for life insurance in 2011). One of the defining characteristics of the economy is entrenched high inflation (and expectations) thanks to persistent monetisation of fiscal deficits. This produces an environment in which no prudent person would enter into a long-term savings contract. According to Business Monitor International, unless and until economic policies in Iran change radically, the reality of the insurance sector will fall a long way short of its potential.

2011, 2012
Blood money was $67,500 in 2011, down from $90,000 a year before.

Since 2012, Iran is insuring its own fleet of oil tankers because of international sanctions.

Payout ratio

Payout ratios have shown consistent growth over the years. Last year, the industry average payout ratio was 86%. Iran has 2 re-insurers. Insurance premiums come to just below 1% of GDP. This is partly attributable to low average income per head. In 2001/02 third-party liability insurance accounted for 46% of premiums, followed by health insurance (13%), fire insurance (around 10%) and life insurance (9.9%).

The Central Insurance of Iran is currently in the process of implementing some deregulation within the industry and migrating from a tariff-based regulation regime to a prudential based one (such as the Solvency regime), which is in line with the internationally accepted standards.

Insurance industry’s payout ratio stood at 63.8% during the fiscal year ended in March 2016. Insurers' generated premiums totaled $6.5 billion during the said period. Iran Insurance Company, the only state-owned  firm, accounted for 39.47% of the premium. Asia Insurance and Alborz Insurance trail by a big margin behind IIC, holding 10.15% and 7.56% of the market’s share, respectively.

Auto liability
Third-part auto liability accounted for 37.6% of insurance firms’ total generated premiums during the year ended in March 2016, with insurers selling about 19.18 million auto policies in the period. As of 2014 total (non-life) market premium was 1.27% of GDP with only $69 per capita spent on insurance.

International
As of 2016, Norway's Skuld (shipping), UK's Steamship Mutual and Standard Club (shipping), Protection and Indemnity (P&I) clubs (shipping), France's Coface (export guarantee agency), Italy's SACE (export credit agency), Germany's Hermes (export credit agency), Austria's OeKB (export credit agency) and Switzerland's SERV (export credit agency) are back doing business in Iran. Many large reinsurance companies are also considering returning to Iran (including Lloyd's, Allianz, Zurich Insurance, Hannover Re and RSA).

References

External links
 Bimeh Markazi Iran

Economy of Iran
Insurance
Government of Iran